Edna Alexander may refer to:
 Edna Alexander (composer) (1892–1972), American soprano singer and music composer
 Edna Alexander (singer) (died 1913), Canadian-born soprano based in the United States and later Europe